Kheyrabad (also Romanized as Kheyrābād) is a village in Qasabeh-ye Sharqi Rural District, in the Central District of Sabzevar County, Razavi Khorasan Province, Iran. At the 2006 census, its population was 684, in 183 families.

References 

Populated places in Sabzevar County